The 1999–2000 West Midlands (Regional) League season was the 100th in the history of the West Midlands (Regional) League, an English association football competition for semi-professional and amateur teams based in the West Midlands county, Shropshire, Herefordshire, Worcestershire and southern Staffordshire.

Premier Division

The Premier Division featured 19 clubs which competed in the division last season, along with three new clubs:
Causeway United, promoted from Division One South
Heath Hayes, promoted from Division One North
Little Drayton Rangers, promoted from Division One North

League table

References

External links

1999–2000
9